The Argent Anthology - A Collection of Greatest Hits is the first compilation album released by British rock band Argent. It was released on the Epic label in 1976. The British release was called The Best of Argent - An Anthology and had a different track list.

Track listing
 "Hold Your Head Up" (Rod Argent, Chris White) – 6:15
 "Liar" (Russ Ballard) – 3:14
 "Pleasure" (Argent, White) – 4:51
 "God Gave Rock and Roll to You" (Ballard) – 6:45
 "It's Only Money, Part 1" (Ballard) – 4:04
 "Thunder and Lightning" (Ballard) – 5:05
 "Tragedy" (Ballard) – 4:47
 "Time Of The Season" [Live] (Argent) – 6:40
Tracks 1 and 7 are from All Together Now
Track 2 is from Argent
Track 3 is from Ring of Hands
Tracks 4 and 5 are from In Deep
Track 6 is from Nexus
Track 8 is from Encore: Live in Concert

UK track listing
 "Schoolgirl" (Ballard) – 3:21
 "It's Only Money, Part 1" (Ballard) – 4:04
 "Pleasure" (Argent, White) – 4:51
 "Hold Your Head Up" (Argent, White) – 6:15
 "Thunder and Lightning" (Ballard) – 5:05
 "Liar" (Ballard) – 3:14
 "God Gave Rock and Roll to You" (Ballard) – 6:45
 "Keep On Rollin'" (Argent, White) – 4:25
Track 1 and 6 are from Argent
Tracks 2 and 7 are from In Deep
Track 3 is from Ring of Hands
Tracks 4 and 8 are from All Together Now
Track 5 is from Nexus

Personnel
Argent
 Rod Argent – keyboards, vocals
 Russ Ballard – guitar, vocals
 Jim Rodford – bass guitar, vocals 
 Robert Henrit – drums, percussion

References

External links 
 allmusic.com
 discogs.com entry

Argent (band) albums
1976 greatest hits albums
Albums produced by Rod Argent
Albums produced by Chris White (musician)
Epic Records compilation albums